The 2015 6 Hours of Shanghai was an endurance sports car racing event held at the Shanghai International Circuit, Shanghai, China on 30 October–1 November 2015, and served as the seventh race of the 2015 FIA World Endurance Championship season. Porsche's Timo Bernhard, Brendon Hartley and Mark Webber won the race driving the No. 17 Porsche 919 Hybrid car.

Qualifying

Qualifying result
Pole position winners in each class are marked in bold.

Race

Race result
Class winners in bold.

References

6 Hours of Shanghai
Shanghai
Shanghai